James Aaron Boyd (born October 17, 1977) is a former defensive back for the Jacksonville Jaguars of the National Football League (NFL). He attended Indian River High School in Chesapeake, and as quarterback, guided the team to a state football championship in 1995.

College career 
Boyd played free safety at Penn State. In 2000, he was one of 12 semifinalists for the Jim Thorpe Award, which is given to the best defensive back in college football.

Professional career 
James was selected in the 3rd round (94th overall) of the 2001 NFL Draft by the Jacksonville Jaguars. He wore #42. In his rookie season (2001–02), he played in 16 games, assisting on 3 tackles and making 6 of his own. In 2002, he deflected two passes and made five solo tackles in ten games.

References 

1977 births
American football defensive backs
Jacksonville Jaguars players
Living people
Penn State Nittany Lions football players
Players of American football from Norfolk, Virginia